Yevgeni Aleksandrovich Maslov (born 7 April 1966) is a Russian professional football coach and a former player. He is the assistant manager for FC Tyumen.

Club career
He made his professional debut in the Soviet Second League in 1984 for FC Geolog Tyumen.

Personal life
He is the father of Pavel Maslov.

References

1966 births
Living people
Soviet footballers
Association football defenders
Russian footballers
FC Tyumen players
Russian Premier League players
Russian football managers
FC Tyumen managers